Henry Dawson (23 August 1791 – 21 December 1889) was an amateur English cricketer.

Dawson represented Hampshire in a single first-class match in 1819 against Epsom Cricket Club. Dawson also played a single first-class match for the Old Etonians against the Gentlemen of England. Dawson also represented the Old Etonians against the Marylebone Cricket Club in a non first-class match.

Dawson died at Torquay, Devon on 21 December 1889.

References

External links

1791 births
1889 deaths
People from Marylebone
Cricketers from Greater London
People educated at Eton College
English cricketers
Hampshire cricketers
English cricketers of 1787 to 1825
Old Etonians cricketers